Titus Flavius T. f. T. n. Sabinus was a Roman senator, who was active during the second half of the first century AD. He was the son of Titus Flavius Sabinus, consul suffectus in AD 69. In that year the younger Sabinus was besieged with his grandfather in the Capitol, but escaped when it was burnt down. He married Julia Flavia, the daughter of his cousin, the future emperor Titus.

Sabinus was consul with his cousin, the emperor Domitian, in AD 82, but was afterwards slain by the emperor, on the frivolous pretext that the herald in proclaiming his consulship had called him Imperator instead of consul.  Domitian's love for Sabinus' wife was perhaps the real reason for his death.

Sabinus' brother was Titus Flavius Clemens, consul in 95.

Family tree

References

Sources
Tacitus, Histories
Philostratus, Life of Apollonius of Tyana
Suetonius, Lives of the Twelve Caesars
Cassius Dio, Roman History

Flavius Sabinus, Titus
Flavii Sabini
Sabinus, Titus Flavius
Flavius Sabinus, Titus
People executed by the Roman Empire
Executed ancient Roman people